The Yupiit School District serves students in the Akiachak, Akiak, and Tuluksak communities in the Bethel Census Area of the U.S. state of Alaska.

Local Control
The district was established in 1984 for the purpose of bringing local control to the schools.  Initial goals of the district included:  knowledge of Yup'ik culture, skills, and values, preparation for advanced education and work, and the ability to communicate in the native language and in English.  Later, the district implemented a curriculum based on the Yup'ik culture.<ref name="Triar">Sternberg, Robert J., et al., "Triarchically-Based Instruction and Assessment of Sixth-Grade Mathematics in a Yup’ik Cultural Setting in Alaska," Gifted and Talented International - Volume 21 Number 2: December 2006, retrieved 2008-12-05</ref>

The school is governed by an elected board with seven members serving three year terms.

Yup'ik culture
The school district offers dual-immersion classes in the Yup'ik culture at the elementary level and Yup'ik studies and Yup'ik language classes at the secondary level.

Students learn skills such as traditional fishing, caribou hunting, and dog-mushing.  Students at the Tuluksak school dog-mush in competition.

Schools
 Akiachak School, grades K-12, 209 students.  This campus also houses a public library.
 Akiak School, grades PK-12, 101 students.  This campus also houses a public library.
 Tuluksak School, grades PK-12, 150 students. This campus also houses a public library.

Demographics
Of the 234 students enrolled in grades 3 through 10 during the week of standardized testing in 2007, 227 were "Alaskan Native or American Indian," 3 were Caucasian, and 4 were Multi-Ethnic.

No Child Left BehindBased on test scores of the 2006-2007 school yearOf the 245 students tested in grades 3 through 10, 30.0% were proficient or better in reading, 23.6% in writing, and 26.7% in mathematics.  The graduation rate was 43%. The Yupiit School District failed to make adequate yearly progress for the 4th consecutive year under No Child Left Behind.Based on test scores of the 2007-2008 school yearOf the 231 students in grades 3 through 10, 18% were proficient in language-arts and 22% were proficient in mathematics.  The district failed to make adequate yearly progress.

School funding lawsuit
In 2004, the Yupiit School District, the NEA-Alaska labor union, and several other school districts sued the state (Moore v. Alaska''), asking for additional funding and educational programs.  In 2007, the court ruled for the state.  In his ruling, the judge cited the Yupiit School District when it said "the state must be more aggressive in overseeing troubled school districts" and ruled that the state exams were unfair.

Sexual assault lawsuits
In 2011, Michael Bowman, a teacher from Montana, was accused of sexually assaulting multiple underage school girls. A $2 million civil lawsuit was settled between the Yupiit School District and nine Alaska native female students and two adults who were allegedly assaulted by Bowman.

In 2015, a female teacher filed a lawsuit against the Yupiit School District alleging "She was subjected to discrimination and harassment during her employment leading to a sexual assault".

See also
 List of school districts in Alaska

References

Bethel Census Area, Alaska
School districts in Alaska
Yupik culture
School districts established in 1984
Education in Unorganized Borough, Alaska
1984 establishments in Alaska